Vladimir Boykov Gogov (born 16 February 1997) is a Bulgarian professional footballer who plays as a defensive midfielder for Bulgarian Second league side Belasitsa Petrich. In his career, Gogov also played for Minyor Pernik, Septemvri Simitli, CSKA 1948 Sofia and Academica Clinceni.

References

External links
 

1997 births
Living people
People from Blagoevgrad Province
Bulgarian footballers
Association football midfielders
First Professional Football League (Bulgaria) players
FC CSKA 1948 Sofia players
Second Professional Football League (Bulgaria) players
FC Septemvri Simitli players
Liga I players
LPS HD Clinceni players
Bulgarian expatriate footballers
Expatriate footballers in Romania
Bulgarian expatriate sportspeople in Romania
Sportspeople from Blagoevgrad Province